Tehran University of Medical Sciences (TUMS) (Danushgah-e 'lum Pezeshki-ye Tehran) is the largest and most highly ranked medical university of Iran. In September 2008, Iran's Minister of Health, Treatment, and Medical Education, Dr. Lankarani, called TUMS a pioneer in research throughout the country with a noticeable lead over its peer universities.

Located in Tehran adjacent to the main University of Tehran campus, it was founded as part of Dar ol-Fonoon in 1851, and later absorbed into the University of Tehran in 1934. It finally separated from University of Tehran by parliamentary legislation in 1986, coming under the new Ministry of Health, Treatment, and Medical Education.

TUMS is ranked as one of Iran's top research universities, with an annual research budget of over 300 billion Rials from the government. The school trains over 13,000 students (40% of whom are women) in approximately 290 undergraduate, graduate and non-degree (short-course) programs. The university has 11 schools, operates 16 teaching hospitals, is equipped with over 44 libraries, and publishes 58 journals, some in collaboration with academic societies.

The university operates The National Museum of Medical Sciences History as well.
TUMS is accredited with Premier Status by Accreditation Service for International Colleges and Universities (ASIC UK)

History 

Before the establishment of Dar-ol-Fonoon, there had been systematic  medical education in Iran dated back to ancient times, as noted in Avesta.Large academic medical education during Sassanid era was embodied in Gundihapur University [see Wikipedia article Ancient Iranian medicine - Wikipedia] 
Systematic mastery and pupillage created early high quality research and practice of all main 
 disciplines, surgery, medicine, pharmaceuticals and psychology:
"Of all the healers O Spitama Zarathustra, namely those who heal with the knife, with herbs, and with sacred incantations, the last one is the most potent as he heals from the very source of diseases.

— Ardibesht Yasht" . In 1851, Dar-ol-Fonoon School was established and medicine was considered as one of its main subjects. The first group of the Schools’ graduates started practicing medicine in 1856. The Dar-ol-Fonoon School of Medicine can be considered as the first modern college of higher education in Iran. In 1918, medicine was deleted from the syllabus of Dar-ol-Fonoon and started to be taught in a separate independent college named “College of Medicine” and in the Same year, the first women's hospital was officially inaugurated. In 1934, the National Consultative Assembly ratified establishment of the University of Tehran to bring together the institutions of higher education, and the government purchased a 200,000 square meter tract in Tehran. The University of Tehran actually started its operation with the six Schools of Medicine, Law, Political Sciences, Science, Letters, Engineering, and Theology. At the same time, the main chairs of the School of Medicine including medicine, pharmacy, and dentistry were determined. On February 4, 1934, the Department of Anatomy was inaugurated as the first step to establishing the School of Medicine in the main campus of University of Tehran. In 1939, the university started offering doctorate degrees in pharmacy and dentistry. In the following year, all of the hospitals in Tehran were affiliated to the School of Medicine. Finally, in 1956 the Schools of Pharmacy and Dentistry were granted their academic independence.

Modern history 
In 1986, the Islamic Consultative Assembly ratified a bill for the establishment of the Ministry of Health, Treatment, and Medical Education. Since then, education of medicine and related disciplines, which had been performed under the supervision of the Ministry of Science, Research and Technology came under the jurisdiction of Ministry of Health, Treatment, and Medical Education. In line with this policy, universities of medical sciences were established and Tehran University of Medical Sciences, separating from the University of Tehran, came to existence to continue operating independently. Upon the emergence of regional health organizations in the universities of medical sciences in 1994, the mentioned universities, including Tehran University of Medical Sciences, came to assume the responsibility of rendering health care services while offering medical education.

Schools 
Tehran University of Medical Sciences includes 10 different Schools (11 with Virtual School) which deal with various academical studies related to medical sciences.

School of Advanced Technologies in Medicine 
One of the Medical Schools is School of Advanced Technologies in Medicine (SATIM). This school was established in 2008 and tried to focus on connection between science and technology. Now it offers 5 major fields which accept Ph.D. students including "Medical Biotechnology", "Molecular Medicine", "Medical Nanotechnology", "Tissue Engineering and Applied Cell Sciences", and "Neurosciences and Addiction Studies". Two of the fields also accept M.Sc. students as well ("Medical Biotechnology" and "Medical Nanotechnology").

Department of Medical Biotechnology 
Department of Medical Biotechnology was one of the three initial fields in the time of school establishment in 2008. It now accepts students in both M.Sc. and Ph.D. levels. It also accept international students based on the university policies. International students could also apply for different financial scholarships.
Using different advanced biotechnology and bioinformatics techniques, academic members try to fill the gap between university and industry in medical sciences.

The university campus 
The place where the anatomy hall, as the first part of the School of Medicine, was built 80 years ago was in the most northern point of the capital city of Tehran. Over the years, the capital city grew faster, and the university campus came to be located in the city center, thus becoming an active center for academic, cultural, political, and social activities of this big crowded city.

The central campus of Tehran University of Medical Sciences is the location of most of the university buildings including the School of Medicine, Pharmacy, Public Health and associated disciplines. Today, what is located at the central campus is a complex of the oldest Schools of Medicine, Pharmacy, Dentistry, and Public Health. In addition to the central campus, the University Headquarters is also located nearby, at the Quds-Keshavarz Intersection. Following the establishment of new schools and due to the limited physical area of the central campus, other schools were moved to different places.

Kooy-e-Daneshgah, the main complex of students’ dormitories, is located in a green-forested area not far from the central campus. In addition to Kooy-e-Daneshgah, there are other students living complexes in different parts of the city as well as 5 dormitories dedicated to housing international students.

TUMS International Campus 
The International Campus was founded in 2006 as the international division of Tehran University of Medical Sciences. The doors of TUMS and its International Campus are open to all international students coming from diverse cultures and backgrounds. In order to provide equal opportunities for talented students who come from a modest background, scholarships and financial aids are available.

Pharmacies 
 Taleghani
 Shahid Abedini
 Dr. Amini
 BooAli
 Isar
 13 aban
 Sina
 Imam Khomeini hospital
 Dr. Shari'ati hospital
 Razi hospital
 Children Hospital
 Subspecialty of 13 Aban

Research centers

Iran has recently achieved the highest science and technology growth rate in the world. Tehran University of Medical Sciences has the largest network of research in medical sciences. Beside the researches done in departments of its faculties, it is now handling over 100 research centers in Iran, some of them listed below. More than one third of science production in Iran takes place in TUMS.

13 research institutes with over 100 research centers are in charge of Tehran University of Medical Science research affairs.

 Endocrinology and Metabolism Research Institute
 Endocrinology and Metabolism Molecular-Cellular Sciences Institute
 Endocrinology and Metabolism Clinical Sciences Institute
 Endocrinology and Metabolism Population Sciences Institute
 The Institute of Pharmaceutical Sciences (TIPS)
 Neuroscience Institute
 Digestive Diseases Research Institute
 Cardiovascular Diseases Research Institute
 Iranian Institute for reduction of High-Risk Behaviors
 Institute for Environmental Research
 Advanced Medical Technologies and Equipment Institute
 Cancer Research Institute
 Dental Research Institute
 Family Health Research Institute

International campus 
In 2006, a group of professors and researchers established the International Campus of Tehran University of Medical Sciences (TUMS-IC). Their main goal was to break new ground in education excellence in the medical fields with an international outlook. Of the over 18,000 students studying at Tehran University of Medical Sciences, there are 781 students enrolled at the International Campus. The current class is matched into the following specialties: 367 in medicine, 191 in dentistry, and 148 in pharmacy. There are 75 students at PhD and MSc levels who study in nutrition and public health programs.

In 2012, the vice-chancellor office for International Affairs and Global Strategies was created and Dr. Ali Arab Kheradmand became the vice-chancellor for International Affairs and Global Strategies. This year, of 45,000 applicants, 150 students will join the International Campus.  Sub-specialist in Plastic and Reconstructive Surgery, Ali Arab Kheradmand the president of the International Campus since its foundation in 2006, is the new vice-chancellor for International Affairs and Global Strategies.

Admissions 
TUMS has well-established admissions processes for students. Iranian students must submit the results of their National Exam, also known as “concours,” and have a successful interview with the members of the Selection Committee. International students, after having completed an online application form for  international admissions, submit their education documents, copy of previous educational degree(s), English proficiency documents, letters of recommendation, letter of motivation, résumé or C.V., passport-size photograph, and a copy of passport's main pages. The Admissions Committee evaluates the qualifications of each student profile and has final authority to admit students.

Students have access to a Scholarship Committee.

Student body 
As of February 2012, about 150 international students are enrolled at TUMS-IC. The coed student body brings together the heritage and culture of 65 nations. The school trains over 19,408 students (40% of which are women) in over 172 postgraduate programs. Teaching the medical sciences can have implications for cultural values and faith-based beliefs. To respect all values and beliefs, the curriculum, classroom teaching, and the student housing centers are adapted for a culturally diverse student and faculty population. Upon their graduation, students will practice medicine in every part of the world. To prepare them, the school offers an education experience and curriculum.

Rankings

Tehran University of Medical Sciences is ranked the first among Iranian Medical Sciences Universities by Ministry of Health for seven continuous years. International ranking of Tehran University of Medical Sciences in recent years is as follows:
 U.S. News & World Report
2017: Medicine: 249
2017: Pharmacy & Pharmacology: 86
 QS World University Rankings
 2017:  International rank: 251-300
Medicine: 251
Pharmacy & Pharmacology: 201
Life Sciences and Medicine: 401
 Academic Ranking of World Universities (ARWU/Shanghai Ranking)>
 2009:  International rank : 402-501
 Times higher education ( In association with QS )
 2009:  International rank: 368, Life Sciences & Biomedicine: 298
 National ranking
 2017:  National rank: 1

Notable alumni and faculty
TUMS has trained many distinguished national and international physicians and scientists. Among the best-known graduates of Tehran University of Medical Sciences, Mohammad Gharib the father of Iranian pediatrics, Moslem Bahadori, AIDS specialist Minoo Mohraz, Abbas Shafiee pharmaceutical chemist, Mohammad-Reza Zarrindast, Ahmad Reza Dehpour, Fereydoun Davatchi, Alireza Mashaghi, Reza Malekzadeh and Parviz Kambin one of the pioneers of minimally invasive spinal surgery. See the list of University of Tehran people.

See also
Healthcare in Iran
Daru-Journal of Faculty of Pharmacy
Higher education in Iran
List of hospitals in Iran
List of Tehran University people

References

External links

Official Persian website
TUMS Public Relations

University of Tehran
Universities in Tehran
Medical schools in Iran
Universities in Iran
Educational institutions established in 1934
1934 establishments in Iran